Henderika "Rika" Bruins (born 12 June 1934) is a retired Dutch swimmer. She competed at the 1952 Summer Olympics in the 200 m breaststroke but failed to reach the final. She was part of Dutch teams that set world records in the 4 × 100 m medley relay in 1954 and 1955.

References

1934 births
Living people
Dutch female breaststroke swimmers
Olympic swimmers of the Netherlands
Swimmers at the 1952 Summer Olympics
Sportspeople from Groningen (city)
World record setters in swimming